The Joseph Warren Yost House is a historic house in Columbus, Ohio. It was added to the Columbus Near East Side District (part of the National Register of Historic Places) in 1978, and the Bryden Road District (part of the Columbus Register of Historic Properties) in 1990.

The house was built c. 1895 for Joseph Warren Yost, a prominent Columbus architect, who also designed the house. The building has rich decorations and detail, including a combination of stone, brick, and terracotta, as well as French-inspired bellcast roofs.

The home's design has numerous similarities to the Charles Frederick Myers house, situated on Bryden a few blocks to the east, and presumably also designed by Yost.

See also
 National Register of Historic Places listings in Columbus, Ohio

References

External links
 

Franklin Park (Columbus neighborhood)
Houses completed in 1895
Houses in Columbus, Ohio
National Register of Historic Places in Columbus, Ohio
Historic district contributing properties in Columbus, Ohio
Columbus Register properties